Stand for Love is the twenty-first studio album by American singer Peabo Bryson. It was released on August 3, 2018, by Perspective Records, with distribution overseen by Caroline, the independent services wing of Capitol Records, his former label. Bryson's first album in a decade, in marked his debut with Perspective, the label by production duo Jimmy Jam and Terry Lewis with whom he worked on the entire album. Stand for Love was preceded by its lead single, "Love Like Yours and Mine" which reached number three on the US Adult R&B Songs chart.

Critical reception
J. Matthew Cobb from HiFi Magazine found that on Stand for Love "Bryson returns to the table and is completely updated on the contemporary R&B age we’re in, not sounding dated or ferociously young. He's somewhere smacked in the middle, crooning over 30-and-up soul and seductive urban beats [...] Some of the tracks feel a bit safe, as if it’s trying to chase after the overrated Charlie Wilson adult-R&B blueprint. But Bryson delivers the songs with such fervor and without any sign of vocal diminishing throughout the course.

Track listing

Sample credits
"Stand for Love" contains a sample of "Help Me Find A Way (To Say I Love You)" by Little Anthony and the Imperials.

Personnel and credits 
Musicians

 Peabo Bryson – lead vocals, backing  vocals (1, 8)
 John Jackson – keyboards (1, 5), bass (1, 5), drum programming (1), instruments (2, 6, 7, 8, 9), backing vocals (2), all other instruments (3), arrangements (7, 9)
 Jimmy Jam – instruments (4), additional drum programming (6)
 Terry Lewis – instruments (4)
 Eric DuBose – guitar (1, 5)
 Gary Clark Jr. – guitar (5)
 David Crenshaw – percussion (1, 3, 5)
 Masaru Nishiyama – orchestra arrangements and conductor (6, 8)
 Huang Lijie – concertmaster (6, 8)
 Asian Philharmonic Orchestra – orchestra (6, 8)
 Lauren Evans – backing vocals (1, 3–9)
 Leon Thomas III – backing vocals (4)
 Chanté Moore – lead vocals (9)

Production

 Michael T. Martin – co-producer 
 Jimmy Jam – executive producer, recording (4)
 Terry Lewis – executive producer, recording
 Satoshi Tanaka – executive producer 
 John Jackson – recording (1, 2, 3, 6–9)
 Thom Kidd – recording (1, 5, 6, 9)
 Nick Bassani – recording (4)
 Christian Plata – mixing (1, 2, 3, 5–9)
 Goetz Botzenhardt – mixing (1, 7, 8)
 Serban Ghenea – mixing (4)
 Matt Marrin – mixing (6, 9)
 Gene Grimaldi – mastering 
 Jason Clark – package design 
 Marselle Washington – photography
 Marco Imagery – photography

Studios

 Recorded at Flyte Tyme Studios (Agoura Hills, California); Jackson's Lyric Studios (Birmingham, Alabama); Silent Sound Studios and Patchwerk Recording Studios (Atlanta, Georgia).
 Mixed at Flyte Tyme Studios; MixStar Studios (Virginia Beach, Virginia); Soho Sound Kitchen (London, UK).
 Mastered at Oasis Mastering (Burbank, California).

Charts

References 

2018 albums
Peabo Bryson albums
Albums produced by Jimmy Jam and Terry Lewis